Carthage Township is one of twenty-four townships in Hancock County, Illinois, USA.  As of the 2010 census, its population was 3,052 and it contained 1,507 housing units.

Geography

Cities, towns, villages
 Carthage

Unincorporated towns
 Middle Creek at 
(This list is based on USGS data and may include former settlements.)

Cemeteries
The township contains these seven cemeteries: Barnes, County Farm, Franklin, Moss Ridge, Old Brick, Old Carthage and Woodring.

Major highways
  U.S. Route 136
  Illinois Route 336
  Illinois Route 94

Airports and landing strips
 Memorial Hospital Heliport

Landmarks
 Jaycee Park

Demographics

School districts
 Southeastern Community Unit School District 337

Political districts
 Illinois's 18th congressional district
 State House District 94
 State Senate District 47

References
 United States Census Bureau 2008 TIGER/Line Shapefiles
 
 United States National Atlas

External links
 City-Data.com
 Illinois State Archives
 Township Officials of Illinois

Townships in Hancock County, Illinois
Townships in Illinois